Kohinoor-IMI School of Hospitality Management is an institution of hotel and tourism management in Khandala, Maharashtra. It was established in 2000 and founded by former Chief Minister of Maharashtra and Speaker of Lok Sabha Manohar Joshi.

Kohinoor-IMI was ranked one among top Hotel Management Institutes in India in the CSR–GHRDC 2013 survey.

Campus
The campus is in Khandala on old Mumbai-Pune highway.

It is fully residential with a capacity of 200 students in the on-campus hostel in a hi-tech environment with wi-fi. There is a library and facilities for sports like volleyball, badminton, table tennis, carrom, modernized gymnasium, etc.

Courses
 B.Sc. in Hospitality Studies and Catering Services (B.Sc.HSCS), UGC recognized university, Maharashtra
 Course Specialization from American Hotel & Lodging Educational Institute

References

External links
 Official Website
 Kohinoor Group

Lonavala-Khandala
Universities and colleges in Pune
Hospitality schools in India
2000 establishments in Maharashtra
Educational institutions established in 2000
Buildings and structures in Lonavala-Khandala